Jesús González (born 4 October 1974) is a Mexican swimmer. He competed in the men's 100 metre butterfly event at the 1996 Summer Olympics.

References

1974 births
Living people
Mexican male swimmers
Olympic swimmers of Mexico
Swimmers at the 1996 Summer Olympics
Place of birth missing (living people)
Male butterfly swimmers